Evelyn Herlitzius (born 27 April 1963) is a German opera singer, a dramatic soprano. She is known for performing major roles in works by Richard Wagner and Richard Strauss, such as Brünnhilde, Isolde and Elektra, at the Semperoper, the Bayreuth Festival and leading European opera houses.

Career 
Born in Osnabrück, Herlitzius first trained to be a dancer. She then studied voice with Hans Kagel and Eckart Lindemann at the Musikhochschule Hamburg. Her debut on the opera stage was as Elisabeth in Wagner's Tannhäuser at the Landestheater Flensburg. After a year she became a member of the Hamburgische Staatsoper.

Semperoper 
Herlitzius was a member of the Semperoper in Dresden from 1997 to 2000, singing major parts such as Janáček's Jenůfa, both Elisabeth and Venus in Tannhäuser, Sieglinde and Brünnhilde in Wagner's Der Ring des Nibelungen, Kundry in his Parsifal, the dyer's wife in Die Frau ohne Schatten by Richard Strauss, his Salome and Puccini's Turandot. The title role in Strauss' Elektra earned her a second Faust award for excellent acting as a singer. In 2014/15 she has appeared as Leonore in Fidelio.

Bayreuth 
Her debut at the Bayreuth Festival was in 2002 the part of Brünnhilde in Wagner's Ring, repeated in the following years. In 2006 and 2007 she was Kundry in Parsifal, in 2010 Ortrud in Lohengrin. In 2015 she stepped in to sing Isolde in the opening of the Bayreuth Festival, staged by Katharina Wagner and conducted by Christian Thielemann. Martin Kettle wrote in The Guardian of her "radiant account of the scene" closing the work.

Guest performances 
Herlitzius performed as a guest at the major opera houses: Gutrune in Wagner's Götterdämmerung at the Badisches Staatstheater Karlsruhe, Marie in Berg's Wozzeck and Leonore in Beethoven's Fidelio at the Saarländisches Staatstheater in Saarbrücken, Leonore also at the Bregenzer Festspiele of 1996, Venus in Henze's Venus und Adonis at the Bayerische Staatsoper, Sieglinde in Wagner's Die Walküre, conducted by Giuseppe Sinopoli at the Accademia di Santa Cecilia in Rome, and Isolde in Tristan und Isolde at the Aalto Theatre in Essen. In 2010 she performed the title role in Janáček's Katja Kabanowa at the Théâtre de la Monnaie. She appeared as Elektra at the Aix-en-Provence 2013, in the last production of stage director Patrice Chéreau. A reviewer called her Elektra "a creature of mesmerising intensity", and wrote "Singing tirelessly and trenchantly – her top notes searing, her delivery of the text pellucid – Herlitzius nails all the character's lithe foxy intelligence and never sinks to histrionic ham or rant." In 2018, she made her long-awaited US debut as Kundry in Parsifal at the Metropolitan Opera.

 Teaching 

Herlitzius has also worked as a voice teacher. Her students have included Mojca Erdmann.

 Awards 
 1999: Christel-Goltz Prize of the foundation for the Semper Opera
 2002: Kammersängerin of Saxony
 2006: Der Faust in the category Beste Sängerdarstellerleistung im Musiktheater (Best singing and acting in musical theatre)
 2014: Der Faust (for Elektra in Dresden)

 References 

 External links 
 
 Evelyn Herlitzius Operabase
 Evelyn Herlitzius (in German) Deutsche Oper Berlin
 Evelyn Herlitzius Archive Vienna State Opera
 Hugo Shirley: Leipzig and Dresden are both staging Elektra. Which city wins?, The Spectator'', 25 January 2014
 A pleasant conversation with the dramatic soprano Evelyn Herlitzius after the triumphant success in Katia Kabanova in the Monnaie in Brussels dhacom.be
 vis-a-vis | Evelyn Herlitzius DresdenEins TV interview, 2 December 2010

German operatic sopranos
1963 births
Living people
Musicians from Osnabrück
20th-century German  women opera singers
21st-century German women opera singers